The 22nd Infantry Division (22-ya Pekhotnaya Diviziya) was an infantry formation of the Russian Imperial Army. It was part of the 1st Army Corps.

Organization
1st Brigade
85th "Vyborksky" Infantry Regiment
86th "Vilmanstranski" Infantry Regiment
2nd Brigade
87th "Neishlotski" Infantry Regiment
88th "Petrovski" Infantry Regiment
22nd Artillery Brigade

Commanders
1906-1908: Leonid Artamonov
1909-1912: Vladimir Apollonovich Olokhov
May 30 - July 30, 1912: Andrei Zayonchkovski
1912-1914: Alexander Alexandrovich Dushkevich

Chiefs of Staff
1866-1868: Aleksandr Fyodorovich Rittikh
1868-1876: Nikolay Bobrikov
1876-1879: Leonid Dembowsky
1879-1884: Ivan Iosifovich Yakubovsky
1884-1890: Alexander Birger
1903-1905: Victor Karl Hermann Kohlschmidt
1905-1911: Alexey Cherepennikov
March-November 1914: Adolph Pfingsten

References

Infantry divisions of the Russian Empire
Military units and formations disestablished in 1918